Mrs A. M. Head (born c. 1895) was an Irish badminton player.

Biography
Mrs  A. M. Head won the Irish Open in 1924, 1925 and 1927. In 1926 she was won the All England Open Badminton Championships, the first Irish woman to do so.

References

1890s births
Irish female badminton players
Date of death unknown